James Robert Hogg (born November 23, 1934) is a retired United States Navy four star admiral who served as U.S. Military Representative to the NATO Military Committee (USMILREP) from 1988 to 1991.

Born in Annapolis, Maryland, Hogg graduated from the United States Naval Academy and was commissioned in the Navy in June 1956. He served for thirty-five years, attaining the rank of admiral in October 1988.

His sea commands included a guided missile cruiser, two destroyer squadrons, and a cruiser-destroyer flotilla. He commanded the United States Seventh Fleet from May 1983 to March 1985.

His Staff service included assignment as Executive Assistant to the Chief of Naval Personnel, Director of Military Personnel Policy, and Director of Naval Warfare working in the areas of military requirements and acquisition.

Before retirement from the Navy in May 1991, he served three years as the U.S. Representative to the NATO Military Committee. He also served for four years as President of the National Security Industrial Association, a major national defense industry association of some 400 companies of all sizes from all segments of industry that relate to U.S. national security.

Admiral Hogg, in addition to the U.S. Naval Academy, is a graduate of the U.S. Air Force Air Command and Staff College and holds a degree of Master of Science in Business Administration at George Washington University. While on active duty he was awarded the Distinguished Service Medal (three), the Legion of Merit (three) and other U.S. and foreign decorations. He has received the Vice Admiral Charles E. Weakley Award (1989), the Betsy Ross Freedom Award (1991), the Rolland M. Teel Award (1995), the U.S. Naval Academy Distinguished Graduate Award (2018), and the Admiral of the Navy George Dewey Award (2019).

In July 1995 he was appointed the Director of the Chief of Naval Operations Strategic Studies Group, from which he retired in mid-2013.

Awards and decorations

References

External links

United States Navy admirals
United States Naval Academy alumni
George Washington University School of Business alumni
Recipients of the Legion of Merit
1934 births
Living people